Krishnakant Patel (16 October 1927 – 12 April 1988) was an Indian cricketer. He played first-class cricket for Hyderabad and Mysore between 1949 and 1959.

See also
 List of Hyderabad cricketers

References

External links
 

1927 births
1988 deaths
Indian cricketers
Hyderabad cricketers
Karnataka cricketers
Cricketers from Bangalore